The Roman Catholic Diocese of Córdoba is a diocese located in the city of Córdoba in the Ecclesiastical province of Sevilla in Spain. Bishop Demetrio Fernández González is the current bishop of Cordoba.

List of bishops

Severo (279)
Grato
Beroso
Osio (295 - 357)
Higinio (358-387)
Gregorio (388)
Esteban (finales del s. V)
Agapio I (antes de 589 - c. 591)
Eleuterio (c. 591 - después de 597)
Agapio II (antes de 614 - c. 618)
Honorio (c. 619- c. 633)
Leudefredo (ca. 630-646)
Fósforo (653)
Mumulo (desde 683-hasta 688)
Felix
Leo (León, Leoncio, Leovigildo?)
Recafredo
...
Valens (862-875)
...
Lope de Fitero (1237 – 10 June 1245)
Gutierre Ruiz de Olea (23 Mar 1246 – 6 Feb 1249 Appointed, Archbishop of Toledo) 
Pedro Yáñez (1249-1251)
Lope Pérez de Retes (1252-1257)
Fernando de Mesa (1257-1274)
Pascual (1274-1293)
Gil Domínguez (1294-1299)
Fernando Gutiérrez (13 Jun 1300 – 11 Apr 1326 Appointed, Bishop of Cuenca)
Gutierre Ruiz (1326-1336)
Juan Pérez de Saavedra (1336-1346)
Fernando Núñez de Cabrera (1346-1350)
Martín Jiménez de Argote (1350-1362)
Andrés Pérez Navarro (22 Mar 1363 – 14 Sep 1372 Died) 
Andrés Pérez Navarro (1363-1372)
Alfonso de Vargas (1373-1379)
Juan Fernández Pantoja (1379-1397)
Menendo, O.F.M. (1378 – 11 Feb 1393 Appointed, Bishop of Bayonne) 
Fernando González Deza (20 Sep 1398 – 1425 Died)
Gonzalo Venegas (1426-1439)
Sancho Sánchez de Rojas (1440-1454)
Gonzalo de Illescas (1454-1464)
Pedro de Córdoba y Solier (1464-1476)
Alonso de Burgos (1477-1483, nombrado obispo de Cuenca)
Tello de Buendía (1483-1484)
Luis Velasco (1484–1485 Died) 
Iñigo Manrique de Lara (bishop) (1485–1496 Died)
Francisco Sánchez de la Fuente (1496 – Sep 1498 Died)
Juan Rodríguez de Fonseca (1499–1504 Appointed, Bishop of Palencia) 
Juan Daza (4 Nov 1504 – 21 May 1510 Died)
Martín Fernández de Angulo Saavedra y Luna (30 Sep 1510 – 21 Jun 1516 Died)
Alfonso Manrique de Lara y Solís (18 Aug 1516 – 31 Aug 1523 Appointed, Archbishop of Sevilla) 
Juan Álvarez y Alva de Toledo, O.P. (31 Aug 1523 – 11 Apr 1537 Appointed, Bishop of Burgos) 
Pedro Fernández Manrique (11 Apr 1537 – 7 Oct 1540 Died) 
Leopoldo de Austria (29 Apr 1541 – 27 Sep 1557 Died) 
Diego Alava Esquivel (21 Oct 1558 – 24 Mar 1562 Died) 
Cristóbal Rojas Sandoval (27 May 1562 – 18 May 1571 Appointed, Archbishop of Sevilla)
Bernardo de Fresneda, O.F.M. (16 Nov 1571 – 14 Oct 1577 Appointed, Archbishop of Zaragoza) 
Martín de Córdoba Mendoza, O.P. (13 Jun 1578 – 5 Jun 1581 Died)
Antonio Rodríguez de Pazos y Figueroa (19 Mar 1582 – 28 Jun 1586 Died)
Francisco Pacheco de Córdoba (14 Jan 1587 – 2 Oct 1590 Died) 
Fernando de la Vega Fonseca (20 Mar 1591 – 3 Sep 1591 Died) 
Pedro Portocarrero (bishop) (12 Jan 1594 – 28 May 1597 Appointed, Bishop of Cuenca)
Francisco Reinoso Baeza (11 Jun 1597 – 23 Aug 1601 Died) 
Pablo Laguna (30 Jul 1603 – 30 Jul 1606 Died) 
Diego Mardones, O.P. (7 Feb 1607 – Sep 1624 Died) 
Cristóbal de Lobera y Torres (19 Feb 1625 – 2 Dec 1630 Appointed, Bishop of Plasencia) 
Jerónimo Ruiz Camargo (16 Feb 1632 – 3 Jan 1633 Died) 
Domingo Pimentel Zúñiga, O.P. (18 Jul 1633 – 19 Jul 1649 Confirmed, Archbishop of Sevilla)
Pedro Tapia, O.P. (23 Aug 1649 – 23 Sep 1652 Appointed, Archbishop of Sevilla)
Juan Francisco Pacheco (14 Oct 1652 – 6 Oct 1653 Appointed, Bishop of Cuenca)
Antonio Valdés Herrera (10 Nov 1653 – 13 Apr 1657 Died)
Francisco Diego Alarcón y Covarrubias (24 Sep 1657 – 18 May 1675 Died)
Alfonso de Salizanes y Medina, O.F.M. (18 Nov 1675 – 19 Nov 1685 Died) 
Pedro de Salazar Gutiérrez de Toledo, O. de M. (16 Sep 1686 – 15 Aug 1706 Died) 
Juan Bonilla Vargas, O.SS.T. (11 Apr 1707 – 1 Jan 1712 Died) 
Francisco Solís Hervás, O. de M. (17 Jan 1714 – 14 Oct 1716 Died) 
Marcelino Siuri Navarro (1 Oct 1717 – 28 Jan 1731 Died) 
Tomás Ratto Ottonelli (9 Nov 1731 – 17 Feb 1738 Died) 
Pedro Salazar Góngora (5 May 1738 – 21 Feb 1742 Died) 
Miguel Vicente Cebrián y Agustín (24 Sep 1742 – 30 May 1752 Died) 
Francisco de Solís Folch de Cardona (25 Sep 1752 – 17 Nov 1755 Appointed, Archbishop of Sevilla)
Martín Barcia Carrascal (12 Jan 1756 – 22 Jun 1771 Died) 
Francisco Garrido de la Vega (30 Mar 1772 – 20 Jan 1776 Died) 
Baltasar Yusta y Navarro (17 Feb 1777 – Dec 1787 Died) 
Antonio Caballero y Góngora (15 Sep 1788 – 24 Mar 1796 Died) 
Agustín Ayestarán y Landa (27 Jun 1796 – 8 Apr 1804 Died) 
Pedro Antonio Trevilla (26 Jun 1805 – 15 Dec 1832 Died) 
Juan José Bonel y Orbe (29 Jul 1833 – 4 Oct 1847 Confirmed, Archbishop of Toledo)
Manuel Joaquín Tarancón y Morón (4 Oct 1847 – 3 Aug 1857 Confirmed, Archbishop of Sevilla)
Juan Alfonso Albuquerque Berión (25 Sep 1857 – 13 Mar 1874 Died) 
Zeferino González y Díaz Tuñón, O.P. (5 Jul 1875 – 15 Mar 1883 Appointed, Archbishop of Sevilla)
Sebastián Herrero y Espinosa de los Monteros, C.O. (15 Mar 1883 – 24 Mar 1898 Appointed, Archbishop of Valencia) 
José Proceso Pozuelo y Herrero (24 Mar 1898 – 23 Mar 1913 Died) 
Ramón Guillamet y Coma (18 Jul 1913 – 22 Apr 1920 Appointed, Bishop of Barcelona) 
Adolfo Pérez y Muñoz (11 Jul 1920 – 21 Dec 1945 Died) 
Albino González y Menédez Reigada, O.P. (18 Feb 1946 – 13 Aug 1958 Died) 
Manuel Fernández-Conde y García del Rebollar (2 Feb 1959 – 1 Jan 1970 Died) 
José María Cirarda Lachiondo (3 Dec 1971 – 31 Jan 1978 Appointed, Archbishop of Pamplona y Tudela) 
José Antonio Infantes Florido (25 May 1978 – 15 Mar 1996 Retired) 
Francisco Javier Martínez Fernández (15 Mar 1996 – 15 Mar 2003 Appointed, Archbishop of Granada) (es) 
Juan José Asenjo Pelegrina (28 Jul 2003 – 13 Nov 2008 Appointed, Coadjutor Archbishop of Sevilla)
Demetrio Fernández González (18 Feb 2010 – )

See also
Roman Catholicism in Spain

References

External links
 GCatholic.org
 Diocese website

Roman Catholic dioceses in Spain
Dioceses established in the 3rd century